Warren Kampf (born May 19, 1967) is an American politician and attorney. He is a member of the Republican Party who served in the Pennsylvania House of Representatives in the 157th District from 2011–2018.

State Representative
In 2010, he was elected to represent the 157th District in the Pennsylvania House of Representatives, defeating incumbent Democrat Paul Drucker. Kampf then faced a rematch with Drucker in the 2012 election, and Kampf maintained his seat.

Kampf lost his seat to Democrat Melissa Shusterman in 2018.

References

External links
Official caucus website
Official PA House website
Official campaign website

Republican Party members of the Pennsylvania House of Representatives
Living people
People from Paoli, Pennsylvania
21st-century American politicians
1967 births

Politicians from Chester County, Pennsylvania
Pennsylvania lawyers
Yale University alumni
Emory University School of Law alumni
Phillips Exeter Academy alumni